Theodore Elmer White (1905–1977), also known as "Ted" or "Doc", was an American paleontologist and zooarchaeologist. Theodore E. White pioneered the use of animal remains as indicators of human behavior in archaeological settings.
He also helped develop the Minimum Number of Individuals (MNI) system, which helps archaeologists determine the minimum number of individuals represented within a skeletal assemblage.

Life and Career 
Theodore E. White was born in Garnett, Kansas on December 8th, 1905. He spent his childhood in Kansas, eventually attending the University of Kansas. He earned a Bachelor of Arts degree in 1928 and a Master's degree in 1929 at KU, both in zoology. There he studied herpetology and mammalogy before moving on to osteology and paleontology. He later attended the University of Michigan, earning his PhD in zoology in 1935. He was never classically trained in zooarchaeology, most likely picking up the study through later work.

In 1932, Theodore went to work for the Harvard Museum of Comparative Anatomy where he stayed until 1947. He had a brief career in the US Army as a technical sergeant during WWII from 1942 to 1945. After this, he worked for the Smithsonian Institution's River Basin Surveys. Most of his career, however, was spent in the National Park Service, working at Dinosaur National Monument, where he was hired in 1953 as the park's first paleontologist. 

Theodore E. White died on September 7th, 1977 and is buried in Welda, Kansas.

Selected publications
Appraisal of the Archeological and Paleontological Resources of the Niobrara River Basin, Nebraska (1947)
Collecting Osteological Material or How to Get a Block Plastered 
Observations On the Butchering Technique of Some Aboriginal Peoples: I (1952)
Studying Osteological Material 
Dinosaur National Monument, Colorado-Utah.  The Dinosaur Quarry by John M. Good, Theodore E. White, & Gilbert F. Stucker (2015)

References

1905 births

1977 deaths